Senator Levy may refer to:

Eugene Levy (politician) (1926–1990), New York State Senate
Meyer Levy (1887–1967), New York State Senate
Norman J. Levy (1931–1998), New York State Senate